Orbassano is a comune (municipality) in the Metropolitan City of Turin in the Italian region Piedmont, located about  southwest of Turin.

Orbassano borders the following municipalities: Turin, Rivoli, Rivalta di Torino, Beinasco, Nichelino, Volvera, Candiolo, None.

History
The known origins of the city date back to the Roman conquest of Cisalpine Gaul, evidenced by two Imperial era tombstones found here in the second half of the nineteenth century.

By the end of the first millennium, Orbassano was among the lands of the Margrave of Susa, but in 1029 it found itself sold by Manfredi to the new Abbey of San Giusto in Susa.   Shortly thereafter, in 1035, some of the land came into the possession of the Diocese of Turin.   In the twelfth century Orbassano came under the control of its northern neighbours the Lords of Rivalta, the Orsini family.

People
Sonia Gandhi was raised here, although she was born in Lusiana, near Vicenza.

Twin towns 

Orbassano is twinned with:
  Ełk, Poland (since 2010)

References

External links
 Official website